The EAN-5 is a 5-digit European Article Number code, and is a supplement to the EAN-13 barcode used on books. It is used to give a suggestion for the price of the book.

ISBN Encoding – Country and Currency Values Description

Encoding

The Encoding of EAN-5 characters is very similar to that of the other European Article Numbers. The only difference is that the digits are separated by 01. The EAN-5 always begins with '01011.' Also, the R-Code is not used.

The structure of the barcode is based on the checksum. In order to compute the checksum, multiply each of the digits by either 3 or 9, alternating each time. Then add them and then do a mod 10. So the checksum for 05415 MN is 1 based on the following calculations:
     
     0*3=0
     5*9=45
     4*3=12
     1*9=9
     5*3=15
   ----------
      81     %    10  = 1

Once you have the checksum digit, you can look up the structure in the following table. Note that the checksum digit is not in the final 5 digits, and is not intended to validate the 5 digit data, but rather to validate the reading of the EAN-5 overall.

References
NACS Codes
Barcode Reference - Section 6.1.46.2
Barcode Writer - The basis for the barcode structure
U.P.C. Symbol Specification Manual - Appendix D - Two-Character and Five-Character to UPC symbol.

Barcodes